Péter Völgyi is a Hungarian sprint canoeist who competed in the early 1970s. He won four medals in the K-1 10000 m events at the ICF Canoe Sprint World Championships with two silvers (1971, 1973) and two bronzes (1970, 1974).

References

Hungarian male canoeists
Living people
Year of birth missing (living people)
ICF Canoe Sprint World Championships medalists in kayak
20th-century Hungarian people